Bělá nad Radbuzou is a town in Domažlice District in the Plzeň Region of the Czech Republic. It has about 1,700 inhabitants.

Administrative parts
Villages of Bystřice, Čečín, Černá Hora, Doubravka, Hleďsebe, Karlova Huť, Nový Dvůr, Pleš, Smolov, Újezd Svatého Kříže and Železná are administrative parts of Bělá nad Radbuzou.

Etymology
Bělá nad Radbuzou got its name probably from the river Radbuza, which was called here Bílý potok ("White Creek").

Geography

The town is situated at the confluence of the Radbuza River and the Bezděkovský Stream. The built-up area lies in the Upper Palatine Forest Foothills, but most of the municipal territory lies in the Upper Palatine Forest and borders Germany in the west.

History
The first written mention of Bělá nad Radbuzou is from 1121, when the near Přimda Castle was built. Until 1600, Bělá nad Radbuzou was a part of the Přimda estate. In the 16th century, it became a property of Lamminger of Albenreuth, a Bavarian noble family. In 1614 the Lamminger family built a small Renaissance castle and a brewery. After the Battle of White Mountain, in 1623, the estate was merged with Újezd Svatého Kříže and the castle ceased to serve as the seat of the estate. In 2014, the castle burned down.

Demographics

Sights

The Church of Our Lady of Sorrows is a landmark of the town centre. It was built in 1721 on the site of a chapel from the late 17th century. The church was completely rebuilt into its current Neoclassical form in 1826–1846.

A cultural monument is the stone bridge over the Bezděkovský Stream from 1820.

Notable people
Jan Smudek (1915–1999), resistance fighter
Hans Drachsler (1916–1996), German politician

Twin towns – sister cities

Bělá nad Radbuzou is twinned with:
 Eslarn, Germany
 Hindelbank, Switzerland

Gallery

References

External links

Cities and towns in the Czech Republic
Populated places in Domažlice District